The Northeast Conference (NEC) is a collegiate athletic conference whose schools are members of the National Collegiate Athletic Association (NCAA). Teams in the NEC compete in Division I for all sports; football competes in the Division I Football Championship Subdivision (FCS). Participating schools are located principally in the Northeastern United States, from which the conference derives its name.

History

The conference was named the ECAC Metro Conference when it was established in 1981. The original eleven member schools were Fairleigh Dickinson University, the Brooklyn campus of Long Island University (whose athletic program has now merged with that of LIU's Post campus into a single athletic program), Loyola College in Maryland (left in 1989), Marist College (left in 1997), Robert Morris University (left in 2020), St. Francis College (NY), Saint Francis College (PA), Siena College (left in 1984), Towson State University (left in 1982), the University of Baltimore (left in 1983) and Wagner College.

The conference's name was changed to its present form on August 1, 1988. Other names considered were Big North, Great North, North Shore, Northern, Northeastern, Eastern and Eastern Private Intercollegiate.

The Northeast Conference has admitted new members nine times since 1981. The expansions and additions from the original charter members were in 1985 (Monmouth University, which left in 2013), 1989 (Mount St. Mary's University, which left in 2022), 1992 (Rider University, which left in 1997), 1997 (Central Connecticut State University), 1998 (Quinnipiac University and the University of Maryland, Baltimore County which respectively left in 2013 and 2003), 1999 (Sacred Heart University), 2008 (Bryant University, which also left in 2022), 2019 (Merrimack College), and 2022 (Stonehill College). The Northeast Conference's full membership was largest at 12 in 2008 with the addition of Bryant University. It then dropped to 10 in 2013 with the departure of Monmouth and Quinnipiac for the Metro Atlantic Athletic Conference (MAAC), returned to 11 with the 2019 addition of Merrimack, and again dropped to 10 in 2020 with the departure of Robert Morris for the Horizon League. It most recently dropped to 9 in 2022 with the departure of Bryant and Mount St. Mary's, respectively for the America East Conference and the MAAC, plus the addition of Stonehill.

Additional changes were announced in 2018 and took effect with the 2019–20 school year. First, on September 10, the NEC announced it would add Merrimack. Then, on October 3, Long Island University announced that it would combine its two existing athletic programs—NEC member LIU Brooklyn and the Division II program at LIU Post—into a single Division I program under the LIU name. The new LIU program, nicknamed Sharks, maintains LIU Brooklyn's previous memberships in Division I and the NEC. Another recent change took place on July 1, 2020, when charter member Robert Morris left to join the Horizon League. The next changes in membership were on July 1, 2022, with Bryant leaving for the America East Conference, Mount St. Mary's leaving for the MAAC, and Stonehill arriving from NCAA Division II.

The Northeast Conference has a total of 9 full members in 24 championship sports: baseball, men's and women's basketball, women's bowling, men's and women's cross country, women's field hockey, football, men's and women's golf, men's and women's indoor track & field, women's lacrosse, men's and women's outdoor track & field, men's and women's soccer, softball, men's and women's swimming, men's and women's tennis, and men's and women's volleyball.

Men's lacrosse became the league's 23rd sport for the 2011 season. The number of sports dropped to 22 after the 2012–13 school year, when the conference dropped field hockey. The departure of Monmouth and Quinnipiac to become all-sports members of the Metro Atlantic Athletic Conference (MAAC) in July 2013 gave the MAAC four full members that sponsored the sport; the other two were NEC single-sport affiliates Rider and Siena. The MAAC then decided to add field hockey as a sponsored sport for the 2013 season, and all of the NEC's remaining field hockey programs eventually joined the MAAC except for Saint Francis (PA), which joined the Atlantic 10 Conference. The NEC reinstated field hockey as a sponsored sport for the 2019 season with seven members—full members Bryant, LIU, Merrimack, Sacred Heart, and Wagner, plus associate members Fairfield and Rider. A more recent addition to the NEC's sports roster was men's swimming & diving, added for 2020–21 with full members Bryant, LIU, Mount St. Mary's, St. Francis Brooklyn, and Wagner plus incoming associate member Howard.

In 2022–23, the NEC added one sport and dropped another. On September 30, 2021, the NEC announced that it would begin sponsoring men's volleyball in 2022–23 with six members. Before the end of the 2021–22 school year, the NEC announced that two Division II schools from the Buffalo, New York area, Daemen and D'Youville, would also become part of the new men's volleyball league. In a May 9, 2022 Twitter post, NEC commissioner Noreen Morris indicated that the NEC would shut down its men's lacrosse league after the then-ongoing 2022 season. The NEC had already lost two full members that sponsored the sport, and would eventually lose its two affiliate members in that sport when the Atlantic 10 Conference announced it would launch a men's lacrosse league in the 2023 season. Three of the remaining four NEC men's lacrosse programs became affiliate members of the Metro Atlantic Athletic Conference. The other program, Merrimack, was in talks with several lacrosse-sponsoring conferences for affiliate membership, and eventually joined the America East in time for the 2023 season.

In July 2022, the Northeast Conference announced a partnership with the Mid-Eastern Athletic Conference in which MEAC schools sponsoring baseball and men's and women's golf would become affiliate members in their respective sports beginning in the 2022-23 season. That September, the NEC announced that MEAC member Delaware State, which had just joined NEC baseball and women's golf, would add women's lacrosse and women's soccer to its NEC membership in 2023–24.

Currently, a total of 12 affiliate members compete in football, women's golf, women's lacrosse, men's and women's soccer, men's and women's swimming, women's bowling, and men's volleyball.

Member schools

Full members

Current full members

Notes

Former full members

Notes

Affiliate members

Current affiliate members

Notes

Future affiliate members

Former affiliate members

Notes

Membership timeline

Sports
The Northeast Conference currently sponsors championship competition in 11 men's and 13 women's NCAA sanctioned sports. Seven schools are associate members in five of those sports.

The most recent changes to the NEC sports lineup came in 2022 with the addition of men's volleyball and the elimination of men's lacrosse.

Notes

Men's sponsored sports by school

Notes

Men's varsity sports not sponsored by the Northeast Conference which are played by NEC schools:

Notes

Women's sponsored sports by school

Notes

Women's varsity sports not sponsored by the Northeast Conference which are played by NEC schools:

In addition to the above, Fairleigh Dickinson and Sacred Heart count their female cheerleaders (but not male cheerleaders) as varsity athletes.

Notes

Basketball champions

Men's basketball champions

Women's basketball champions

Football champions
Football champions
 1996 – Robert Morris/Monmouth
 1997 – Robert Morris
 1998 – Monmouth/Robert Morris
 1999 – Robert Morris
 2000 – Robert Morris
 2001 – Sacred Heart
 2002 – Albany
 2003 – Monmouth/Albany
 2004 – Monmouth/Central Connecticut
 2005 – Stony Brook/Central Connecticut
 2006 – Monmouth
 2007 – Albany
 2008 – Albany
 2009 – Central Connecticut
 2010 – Robert Morris/Central Connecticut
 2011 – Albany/Duquesne
 2012 – Wagner/Albany
 2013 – Sacred Heart/Duquesne
 2014 – Sacred Heart/Wagner
 2015 – Duquesne
 2016 – Saint Francis (PA)/Duquesne
 2017 – Central Connecticut
 2018 – Duquesne/Sacred Heart
 2019 - Central Connecticut
 2020 - Sacred Heart
 2021 - Sacred Heart
 2022 - Saint Francis (PA)Most conference championships
 6 – Albany (3 shared)
 6 – Robert Morris (3 shared)
 6 – Central Connecticut (3 shared)
 5 – Sacred Heart (3 shared)
 5 – Duquesne (4 shared)
 5 – Monmouth (4 shared)
 2 – Saint Francis (PA) (1 shared)
 2 – Wagner (2 shared)
 1 – Stony Brook (1 shared)

NEC Rivalries
Before the 2013 departure of Monmouth and Quinnipiac, the NEC had 6 rivalry matchups in the conference; which is most prevalent during NEC's men's and women's basketball "Rivalry Week."  The concept of playing back-to-back games against a local rival the same week is the only one of its kind among the nation's 31 NCAA Division I conferences.  The pre-2013 NEC rivalries are as follows (with the current NEC team listed first in the matchups that are now non-conference):

Currently in-conference
Battle of Brooklyn: LIU vs. St. Francis Brooklyn
Constitution State Rivalry: Central Connecticut vs. Sacred Heart

Non-conference
Garden State Rivalry: Fairleigh Dickinson vs. Monmouth (non-conference since 2013–14)
Governor's Cup: Sacred Heart vs. Quinnipiac (non-conference since 2013–14)
Keystone Clash: Saint Francis (PA) vs. Robert Morris (non-conference since 2020–21)
NY–MD Showdown: Wagner vs. Mount St. Mary's (non-conference since 2022–23)

Brenda Weare Commissioner's Cup
The NEC Commissioner's Cup was instituted during the 1986-87 season with Long Island winning the inaugural award. Cup points are awarded in each NEC sponsored sport.  For men's and women's basketball, men's and women's soccer, women's volleyball, football, women's bowling, softball, men's and women's lacrosse, and baseball, the final regular season standings are used to determine Cup points.  Starting with the 2012-13 season, the Conference began awarding three bonus points to the NEC Tournament champion in those sports.  In all other sports, points are awarded based on the finish at NEC Championship events.

Facilities

Notes

See also
List of American collegiate athletic stadiums and arenas

References

External links
 

 
Northeastern United States
Sports in the Eastern United States
Sports organizations established in 1981